Svea is a Swedish female name derived from the tribe called "Svear" or "Swedes," who came to conquer the land which is today's Sweden.  The name was very popular in Sweden during the first half of the 20th century, and in the 2010s began to revive in popularity. Mother Svea is a national personification of Sweden. People named Svea include:

 Svea (singer), Svea Virginia Kågemark (born 1999), a Swedish pop singer 
 Svea Kristina Frisch, (1898–1991), known as Kristina Lindstrand, a Swedish actor, journalist, author, and poet
 Svea Holst (1901–1996), a Swedish film actress
 Svea Josephy, (born 1969) a South African photographer
 Svea Köhrbrück, (born 1993), a German sprinter
 Svea Norén (1895–1985), a Swedish figure skater
 Svea Nordblad Welander (1898–1985), a Swedish composer, organist, teacher, and violist

See also
 Svea (disambiguation)

Swedish feminine given names